Bite the Dust may refer to:

 A figure of speech for death
 "Bite the Dust", a track on the 2005 Pussycat Dolls album PCD
 "Another One Bites the Dust", a 1980 song by Queen
 Bite the Dust (film), a 2013 Russian film